Magnus Nils Gustafsson (born 3 January 1967) is a tennis coach and former top ten professional tennis player from Sweden. Gustafsson won 14 tour singles titles during his career and finished 15 consecutive seasons within the world's top 100, reaching a career-high singles ranking of world No. 10 in 1991. He was instrumental in Sweden capturing the Davis Cup in 1998, winning both his singles rubbers in the final in straight sets. His best performance at a Grand Slam event came at the Australian Open in 1994, where he reached the quarterfinals. During his career, he beat several top five players including Ivan Lendl, Michael Stich, Goran Ivanisevic, Andre Agassi and Michael Chang.

Career finals

Singles: 26 (14–12)

Doubles: 8 (1–7)

Singles performance timeline

References

External links
 
 
 

Sportspeople from Lund
Swedish male tennis players
Olympic tennis players of Sweden
Tennis players at the 1992 Summer Olympics
Tennis players at the 1996 Summer Olympics
1967 births
Ferris State University alumni
Living people
Sportspeople from Gothenburg